The French Equal Opportunities and Anti-Discrimination Commission (French Haute autorité de lutte contre les discriminations et pour l'égalité or HALDE) is a French "independent administrative authority"  which "has the right to judge all discrimination, direct or indirect, that is prohibited by law or an international agreement to which France is a signatory."

HALDE was created by law n° 2004-1486 on 30 December 2004, published in the Journal officiel on 31 December 2004.

Composition
HALDE has twelve members who are appointed by the French President for five-year terms. They can neither be expelled from their posts nor reappointed at the end of them.
New members are added every thirty months, with five members being removed at this time (the president of HALDE stays, however). Thus, five of the first members were limited to 30 month-terms. These five will be selected randomly at HALDE's first meeting.

HALDE's members are chosen according to the following allotment:

two members (one woman and one man) share the presidency—they are selected by the French president;
two members (one woman and one man) are selected by the president of the French Senate;
two members (one woman and one man) are chosen by the president par president of the French National Assembly;
two members (one woman and one man) are chosen by the prime minister;
one member (male or female) is chosen by the vice-president of the Council of State;
one member (male or female) is chosen by the first president of the Cour de cassation;
one member (male or female) is chosen by president of the French Economic and Social Council.

Duties
HALDE is aided by a consultative committee named by itself, including people who "have an activity within the scope of the struggle against discrimination and for the promotion of equality."

Cases are submitted to HALDE in three different ways:

Anyone who believes himself or herself to have been a victim of discrimination can appeal to HALDE, either independently, through a member of the National Assembly, through a senator or through a French MEP;
HALDE can take pursue cases of discrimination itself, with the agreement of the alleged victim;
Any group (that is at least five years old) whose charter aims to "fight discrimination or to help victims of discrimination" can accompany the case of an individual who believes to have been a victim of discrimination, if this individual wants this.

HALDE is entitled to lead various hearings as well as investigations; it can also send files to the procureur de la République. HALDE also promotes equality generally, and can recommend modifications of existing laws or rules, and publishes a public annual report concerning its performance of its duties.

HALDE's members
President:
 Louis Schweitzer (former CEO of Renault), appointed 3 March 2005
 Jeanette Bougrab, 16 April 2010
 Éric Molinié, 10 December 2010

See also 
Anti-discrimination law
Human rights in France
National human rights institutions

References

Human rights in France
Government agencies of France
Discrimination in France